Christina Marie Gibbons (born December 30, 1994) is an American soccer player who plays as a defender.

Club career

FC Kansas City, 2017
After spending four years playing at Duke University, Gibbons was drafted by FC Kansas City with the 5th overall pick in the 2017 NWSL College Draft. She appeared in all 24 games for FCKC, where she scored 1 goal.

Loan to Melbourne Victory, 2017–2018
On October 4, 2017, Gibbons was loaned to Melbourne Victory. She scored her first goal against Melbourne City, a game winner in the 86th minute.

Sky Blue FC, 2018
In December 2017, Gibbons was traded to Sky Blue FC alongside teammate Shea Groom.

International career
Gibbons received a call-up to the United States women's national soccer team for their 2017 January Camp. She has not yet been capped by the team.

References

External links
 Duke bio
 

1994 births
Living people
American women's soccer players
Duke Blue Devils women's soccer players
FC Kansas City draft picks
FC Kansas City players
Melbourne Victory FC (A-League Women) players
National Women's Soccer League players
NJ/NY Gotham FC players
Soccer players from Raleigh, North Carolina
United States women's under-20 international soccer players
Women's association football defenders
Soccer players from North Carolina